The 1979 Philadelphia mayoral election saw the election of William J. Green III.

Ahead of the election there had been an unsuccessful effort to amend the city charter to allow incumbent mayor Frank Rizzo to run for a third consecutive term.

Democratic primary

Candidates

Declared
 Charles W. Bowser, independent candidate for Mayor in 1975
 George G. Britt, Jr., management consultant and perennial candidate
 C. Douglas Clark
 William J. Green III, former U.S. Representative and candidate for U.S. Senate in 1976
 Frank Lomento, pretzel vendor and perennial candidate
 Ralph C. Morrone
 Ronald David Tinney
 Gil W. Veasey 
 Inez Walker

Withdrew
 Albert V. Gaudiosi, former City Commerce Director
 William G. Klenk, City Controller

Results

Republican primary

Candidates

Declared
 David W. Marston, former U.S. Attorney and candidate for Governor in 1978

Results
Marston was unopposed for the Republican nomination.

Independents and third parties

Consumers
 Lucien Blackwell, City Councilman from District 3

General election

Results

References

1979
Philadelphia
1979 Pennsylvania elections
1970s in Philadelphia